Where Our Love Grows is the eighth studio album by the British group Swing Out Sister. The album was released in 2004 and was produced by Paul Staveley O'Duffy.

On this album, group members Andy Connell and Corinne Drewery continued in their customary roles, with Drewery on lead and backing vocals and Connell providing instruments including piano, organ, vibraphone, electric bass, keyboards and synthesizers. Other contributing musicians include Tim Cansfield and Matt Backer on guitars, Nigel Hitchcock on saxophone and Luís Jardim on percussion. Other backing vocals were sung by Connell, O'Duffy, Gina Foster and Gersende Giorgio.

Track listing
"Love Won't Let You Down" - 4:19  (Andy Connell/Corinne Drewery/Paul Staveley O'Duffy) 
"Where Our Love Grows" - 3:55  (A. Connell/C. Drewery/P. S. O'Duffy) 
"When the Laughter Is Over - 3:43  (A. Connell/C. Drewery/P. S. O'Duffy/Nichols/Roberds/Margolin) 
"Certain Shades of Limelight" - 4:06  (A. Connell/C. Drewery/P. S. O'Duffy/Bacharach/David) 
"From My Window" - 4:42  (A. Connell/C. Drewery/P. S. O'Duffy) 
"Caipirinha" - 4:42  (A. Connell/C. Drewery/P. S. O'Duffy) 
"Where Our Love Grows (A Cappella)" - 2:06  (A. Connell/C. Drewery/P. S. O'Duffy) 
"Let the Stars Shine" - 4:01  (A. Connell/C. Drewery/P. S. O'Duffy) 
"We'll Find a Place" - 3:59  (A. Connell/P.S. O'Duffy) 
"Happy Ending" - 4:14  (A. Connell/C. Drewery/P. S. O'Duffy) 
"La Source" - 3:42  (A. Connell/C. Drewery/P. S. O'Duffy) 
"Love Won't Let You Down (More Love)" - 4:02  (A. Connell/C. Drewery/P. S. O'Duffy) 

"When the Laughter Is Over"  (Contains a sample of "I Can See Only You" as performed by Roger Nichols)  
"Certain Shades of Limelight"  (Contains a sample of "Don't Say I Didn't Tell You So" by Herbie Mann)

Personnel 
Swing Out Sister
 Andy Connell – acoustic piano, Fender Rhodes, organ, keyboards, synthesizers, bass, vibraphone, vocal ensemble 
 Corinne Drewery – lead vocals, vocal ensemble

Additional Musicians
 Matt Becker – guitar 
 Tim Cansfield – guitar 
 Paul Staveley O'Duffy – rhythm programming, sequencing, percussion, vocal ensemble
 Luis Jardim – percussion 
 Nigel Hitchcock – saxophone 
 Gina Foster – backing vocals 
 Gersende Giorgio – backing vocals

Production 
 Paul Staveley O'Duffy – producer, engineer, mixing 
 Richard Bonner Morgan – cover design 
 James Martin – photography 
 Dave Norton – sleeve notes
 Mary Edwards – liner notes 
 Geoff Kite – management

References

External links
Where Our Love Grows U.S. release info from discogs.com

2004 albums
Swing Out Sister albums